"Let Me Blow Ya Mind" is a song by American rapper Eve, featuring American singer Gwen Stefani. It was released on April 2, 2001, as the second and final single from Eve's second album, Scorpion (2001). It became Eve's highest-charting single on the US Billboard Hot 100 (alongside 2002's "Gangsta Lovin'"), peaking at number two on the week of August 18, 2001. Worldwide, the song reached number 29 in Canada, number four in Australia and the United Kingdom, and number one in Belgium (Flanders and Wallonia), Ireland, Norway and Switzerland.

The song was listed at number seven on the 2001 Pazz & Jop list, a survey of several hundred music critics conducted by Robert Christgau. It won a Grammy Award in 2002 for Best Rap/Sung Collaboration, which was a new category at the time. The music video won the 2001 MTV Video Music Award for Best Female Video.

Composition and lyrics
The song is performed in the key of G minor in common time with a tempo of 90 beats per minute. The lyrics address those who doubted Eve's ability to maintain mainstream popularity.

The song came after Eve who had initially been signed by Dr. Dre at the age of 18 was dropped from his Aftermath label for lack of direction. After her second deal with Ruff Ryders, she was able to reconnect with Dr. Dre. It was a song that was written completely by Eve, usually only writing verses prior she wrote the chorus as well after being instructed by Dr. Dre to do so. Scott Storch was brought in to co-produce who Eve had known since the age of 15. There was an air of doubt from the label that the song would chart, because of the mix between Eve and Gwen Stefani for vocals, their chemistry was strong with an instant connection after meeting each other.

Music video
In the video, Gwen Stefani and Eve are shown stopping at a red light. Eve brings in a gang of party crashers, and she tells Gwen to tag along. Gwen gets out of her car and gets onto a all-terrain vehicle. They crash a formal party (whose attendees include actor Udo Kier) with their loud music and rowdiness and are subsequently arrested. A Leona Helmsley lookalike appears in the video. She tells police officers about the disturbance as Stefani and Eve disrupt the party. Rapper/producer Dr. Dre also makes an appearance at the end of the video when he comes to jail and pays the bail for Eve and Stefani. Fellow Ruff Ryders Jadakiss and Styles P appear in a scene in which Eve acts as a bartender.

The video won the 2001 MTV Video Music Award for Best Female Video, and it was also nominated for Best Hip-Hop Video, losing to Outkast's "Ms. Jackson".

Track listings
All versions of "Let Me Blow Ya Mind" feature Gwen Stefani.

Australasian CD single
 "Let Me Blow Ya Mind" (album version) – 3:50
 "Got It All" (featuring Jadakiss) – 3:48
 "Who's That Girl?" (Akhenaton remix) – 3:59
 "Let Me Blow Ya Mind" (video) – 4:15

European CD single
 "Let Me Blow Ya Mind" (album version) – 3:50
 "Got It All" (featuring Jadakiss) – 3:48

European enhanced CD single
 "Let Me Blow Ya Mind" – 3:50
 "Who's That Girl?" (C.L.A.S. remix) – 4:28
 "Ain't Got No Dough" (featuring Missy Elliott) – 4:17
 "Let Me Blow Ya Mind" (CD-ROM video)

UK CD single
 "Let Me Blow Ya Mind" – 3:50
 "Who's That Girl?" (Akhenaton remix) – 3:58
 "Gotta Man" – 4:24
 "Let Me Blow Ya Mind" (video)

UK 12-inch single
A1. "Let Me Blow Ya Mind" – 3:50
A2. "Let Me Blow Ya Mind" (instrumental) – 5:15
B1. "Who's That Girl?" (C.L.A.S. remix) – 4:28

UK cassette single
 "Let Me Blow Ya Mind" – 3:50
 "Who's That Girl?" (main pass) – 3:58

Charts

Weekly charts

Year-end charts

Decade-end charts

Certifications

Release history

References

2000 songs
2001 singles
European Hot 100 Singles number-one singles
Eve (rapper) songs
Funk songs
Grammy Award for Best Rap/Sung Collaboration
Gwen Stefani songs
Interscope Records singles
Irish Singles Chart number-one singles
MTV Video Music Award for Best Female Video
Number-one singles in Norway
Number-one singles in Switzerland
Ruff Ryders Entertainment singles
Song recordings produced by Dr. Dre
Song recordings produced by Scott Storch
Songs written by Dr. Dre
Songs written by Eve (rapper)
Songs written by Mike Elizondo
Songs written by Scott Storch
Ultratop 50 Singles (Flanders) number-one singles
Ultratop 50 Singles (Wallonia) number-one singles